The Old Clam House is the oldest continuously operating restaurant in San Francisco. It was opened in 1861 to sell food to workers on the waterfront. In 2021, the restaurant was put up for sale by the owners who had decided to retire.

The restaurant closed in March 2020 and reopened in April 2022 with new owners. Former owners Jerry Dal Bozzo and Dante Serafini retired (they also owned The Stinking Rose) and sold to Filomena Florese.

References

1861 establishments in California
Seafood restaurants in the United States
Restaurants in San Francisco